According to the Planetary and Space Science Centre (PASSC) at the University of New Brunswick in Canada, there are 190 confirmed impact structures on Earth. Each is recorded in a database called the Earth Impact Database (EID).

List of confirmed and possible impact structures 
The following tables list geological features on Earth that are known impact events as well as possible, but for which there is currently no confirming scientific evidence in the peer-reviewed literature, impact events. In order for a structure to be confirmed as an impact crater, it must meet a stringent set of well-established criteria. Some proposed impact structures are likely to eventually be confirmed, whereas others are likely to be shown to have been misidentified (see below). Recent extensive surveys have been done for Australian (2005), African (2014), and South American (2015) craters, as well as those in the Arab world (2016). A book review by A. Crósta and U. Reimold disputes some of the evidence presented for several of the South American structures.

Overview 
Russia's Lake Cheko is thought by one research group to be the result of the famous Tunguska event, although sediments in the lake have been dated back more than 5,000 years. There is highly speculative conjecture about the supposed Sirente impact (c. 320 ± 90 AD) having caused the Roman emperor Constantine's vision at Milvian Bridge.

The Burckle crater and Umm al Binni structure are proposed to be behind the floods that affected Sumerian civilization. The Kachchh impact may have been witnessed by the Harappan civilization and mentioned as a fireball in Sanskrit texts.

Shortly after the Hiawatha Crater was discovered, researchers suggested that the impact could have occurred as late as ~12,800 years ago, leading some to associate it with the Younger Dryas impact hypothesis. James Kennett, a leading advocate of the Younger Dryas impact hypothesis said, "I'd unequivocally predict that this crater is the same age as the Younger Dryas."

These claims were criticised by other scholars. According to impact physicist Mark Boslough writing for Skeptical Inquirer the first reports of the impact released by science journalist Paul Voosen focused on this being a young crater which according to Boslough "set the tone for virtually all the media reporting to follow". Boslough argued, based on evidence and statistical probability, that once the crater has been drilled and researched "it will turn out to be much older." He complained that this important discovery "was tainted by connections to a widely discredited hypothesis and speculations that did not make it through peer review".

A 2022 study using Argon–Argon dating of shocked zircon crystals in impact melt rocks found outwash less than 10 km downstream of the glacier pushed the estimate back to around 57.99 ± 0.54 million years ago, during the late Paleocene. Confirmation would require drilling almost  through the ice sheet above the crater to obtain a sample of dateable, solidified impact melt from the crater.

The age of the Bloody Creek crater is uncertain.

The Decorah crater has been conjectured as being part of the Ordovician meteor event.

Several twin impacts have been proposed, such as the Rubielos de la Cérida and Azuara (30–40 Ma), Cerro Jarau and Piratininga (c. 117 Ma), and Warburton East and West (300–360 Ma). However, adjacent craters may not necessarily have formed at the same time, as demonstrated by the case of the confirmed Clearwater East and West lakes.

Some confirmed impacts like Sudbury or Chicxulub are also sources of magnetic anomalies and/or gravity anomalies. The magnetic anomalies Bangui and Jackpine Creek, the gravity anomalies Wilkes Land crater and Falkland Islands, and others have been considered as being of impact origin. Bangui apparently has been discredited, but appears again in a 2014 table of unconfirmed structures in Africa by Reimold and Koeberl.

Several anomalies in Williston Basin were identified by Swatzky in the 1970s as astroblemes including Viewfield, Red Wing Creek, Eagle Butte, Dumas, and Hartney, of which only the last two are unconfirmed.

The Eltanin impact has been confirmed (via an iridium anomaly and meteoritic material from ocean cores) but, as it fell into the Pacific Ocean, apparently no crater was formed. The age of Silverpit and the confirmed Boltysh crater (65.17 ± 0.64 Ma), as well as their latitude, has led to the speculative hypothesis that there may have been several impacts during the KT boundary. Of the five oceans in descending order by area, namely the Pacific, Atlantic, Indian, Antarctic, and Arctic, only the smallest (the Arctic) does not yet have a proposed unconfirmed impact crater.

For example, the Ishim impact structure is conjectured to be bounded by the late Ordovician-early Silurian (c. 445 ± 5 Ma), the two Warburton basins have been linked to the Late Devonian extinction (c. 360 Ma), both Bedout and the Wilkes Land crater have been associated with the severe Permian–Triassic extinction event (c. 252 Ma), Manicouagan (c. 215 Ma) was once thought to be connected to the Triassic–Jurassic extinction event (c. 201 Ma) but more recent dating has made it unlikely, while the consensus is the Chicxulub impact caused the one for Cretaceous–Paleogene (c. 66 Ma).

However, other extinction theories employ coeval periods of massive volcanism such as the Siberian Traps (Permian-Triassic) and Deccan Traps (Cretaceous-Paleogene).

Undiscovered but inferred 

There is geological evidence for impact events having taken place on Earth on certain specific occasions, which should have formed craters, but for which no impact craters have been found. In some cases this is because of erosion and Earth's crust having been recycled through plate tectonics, in others likely because exploration of the Earth's surface is incomplete, or because no actual crater was formed because the impacting object exploded as a cosmic air burst. Typically the ages are already known and the diameters can be estimated.

Mistaken identity 
Some geological processes can result in circular or near-circular features that may be mistaken for impact craters. Some examples are calderas, maars, sinkholes, glacial cirques, igneous intrusions, ring dikes, salt domes, geologic domes, ventifacts, tuff rings, forest rings, and others. Conversely, an impact crater may originally be thought as one of these geological features, like Meteor Crater (as a maar) or Upheaval Dome (as a salt dome).

The presence of shock metamorphism and shatter cones are important criteria in favor of an impact interpretation, though massive landslides (such as the Köfels landslide of 7800 BC which was once thought to be impact-related) may produce shock-like fused rocks called "frictionite".

See also 
 Earth Impact Database
 Gliese 710 – example of gravitational perturbations (in mega-year scale) of the Solar System
 Impact Field Studies Group
 Impact craters
 Impact events
 List of impact craters on Earth
 List of meteor air bursts
 Tollmann's bolide hypothesis
 Traces of Catastrophe, 1998 book from Lunar and Planetary Institute – comprehensive reference on impact crater science

Notes and references

Notes

References

Bibliography

External links 
 Earth Impact Database – List of confirmed earth impact sites at the Planetary and Space Science Centre, University of New Brunswick
 Impact Database (formerly Suspected Earth Impact Sites list) maintained by David Rajmon for Impact Field Studies Group, US

+
Lists of coordinates